Axel Dörner (born 26 April 1964 in Cologne, Germany) is a German trumpeter, pianist, and composer.

Biography 

Dörner studied piano in the Dutch town Arnhem (1988–89) and at the Music Academy in Cologne (1989–1996). From 1991 he studied trumpet with Malte Burba, and during his studies he collaborated with trumpeter Bruno Light as the Street Fighters Duo. The duo expanded to form the Street Fighters Quartet and the Street Fighters Double Quartet, with members including Matthias Schubert, Bruno Leicht, and Claudio Puntin. He formed the Axel Dörner Quartet with Frank Gratkowski, Hans Schneider, and Martin Blume, and played with saxophonist Matthias Petzold on the albums Lifelines and Psalmen Und Lobgesänge.

Dörner has lived in Berlin since 1994 and is an integral part of the Berlin scene of new improvisational and experimental music. Besides playing solo and in his trio TOOT (with Phil Minton and Thomas Lehn), he has played with artists such as Otomo Yoshihide and in groups such as Die Anreicherung (with Christian Lillinger, Håvard Wiik, and Jan Roder), Ig Henneman Sextet, Ken Vandermark's Territory-Band, Hedros (with Mats Gustafsson, Günter Christmann, Barry Guy, and others), and the London Jazz Composers' Orchestra. A versatile musician, he is also able to work in idiomata such as bebop. He played on pianist Alexander von Schlippenbach's album Monk's Casino, featuring interpretations of the complete compositions of Thelonious Monk.

Selected discography 

 2001: Trumpet (A Bruit Secret)
 2007: Sind (absinthRecords)

References

External links 
 Official website of Axel Dörner
 European Free Improvisation Pages
 FMP Publications

1964 births
Living people
ECM Records artists
Musicians from Cologne
Musicians from Berlin
German jazz composers
Male jazz composers
German jazz trumpeters
Male trumpeters
German multi-instrumentalists
20th-century trumpeters
21st-century trumpeters
20th-century jazz composers
21st-century jazz composers
Berlin Contemporary Jazz Orchestra members
21st-century German male musicians
20th-century German male musicians
Locust Music artists